Akwas by Mike Roy is a Sunday only adventure comic strip which ran from June 14, 1964, to March 28, 1965, and was syndicated through 1972.  It featured the Native American character Akwas in realistic historical adventures set before Christopher Columbus' voyage to the Americas. 

The best format is the half page; the strip is also found in a third of a page and tabloid formats, which drop one or more panels. The strip had a topper called Indian Lore and Crafts.

There were four stories: Cricket Kidnapped, The Dream Fast, Mission to the Huron, and Jessakid. Toward the end of the strip, as it appeared in fewer and fewer newspapers, Mike Roy attempted to revive interest by giving Akwas superpowers. The strip ended shortly after this. 

None of the stories have been reprinted, but one Akwas strip can be seen on the cover of Comics Revue #266.

References

Bibliography
 Green, Paul. Encyclopedia of Weird Westerns, p. 181, "Roy was well known for his work on the Native American Sunday strip Akwas in the 1960s.", McFarland, 2009, .
 Roy, Mike. The Best of Mike Roy, Ward Ritchie Press, 1978, ASIN: B000NYCCAY
 Strickler, Dave. Syndicated Comic Strips and Artists, 1924-1995: The Complete Index. Cambria, CA: Comics Access, 1995. .
 Norwood, Rick. "An Episode Guide to Akwas by Mike Roy," Comics Revue #266. 

1964 comics debuts
1965 comics endings
Fictional Native American people
Adventure comics
Comics set in the 15th century
American comics characters
Comics characters introduced in 1964
Native Americans in popular culture
Pre-Columbian America in fiction
Male characters in comics